Payne Harrison (born 1948/'49) is an American author. Harrison is a New York Times bestselling writer, and author of five novels in the genres of mystery, espionage, techno-thriller and military.

Bibliography
Harrison holds B.A. and M.A. degrees from Texas A&M University, and an M.B.A. from Southern Methodist University.  He lives in Dallas, Texas and formerly worked as a newspaper reporter and business consultant.  (Information found on back flap of Black Cipher book jacket.  Credits: Crown Publishing, Inc., New York, NY)

Novels
 Storming Intrepid (Crown Publishing), 1989, 531 pages, 
 The Thunder of Erebus (Crown Publishing), 1991, 
 Black Cipher (Crown Publishing), 1994, 337 pages, 
 Forbidden Summit (Crown Publishing), 1997, 340 pages, 
 Eurostorm (Variance Publishing), 2010, 326 pages, 
Longitude Lost (Overflight Press), 2019, 665 pages,

References

External links

American thriller writers
Texas A&M University alumni
Living people
1949 births
American male novelists
Southern Methodist University alumni
Writers from Dallas
20th-century American novelists
21st-century American novelists
20th-century American male writers
21st-century American male writers
Novelists from Texas